Eugene Gearty is an American sound engineer. He was nominated for an Academy Award in the category Best Sound for the film Gangs of New York. He has worked on over 80 films since 1983. At the 84th Academy Awards, Gearty won an Oscar for Best Sound Editing for his work on Martin Scorsese's Hugo. He also won Emmy Award for Boardwalk Empire.

Selected filmography
 Gangs of New York (2002)
 Hugo (2011)
 Life of Pi (2012)
 The Irishman (2019)

References

External links

Year of birth missing (living people)
Living people
American audio engineers
Best Sound Editing Academy Award winners
Best Sound BAFTA Award winners
Emmy Award winners